Bardowick (Bewick in Low Saxon) is a municipality in the district of Lüneburg in Lower Saxony, Germany. It is three miles north of Lüneburg on the navigable river Ilmenau. Bardowick is also the seat of the Samtgemeinde ("collective municipality") Bardowick.

History
The town was first mentioned in 795 AD and was raised to city status in 972 by Otto I. Its name is derived from the Longobardi, the tribe for whom it was the home and centre. From it the colonization of Lombardy started under their nontrinitarian Arian king Alboin.

In 1146 the collegiate church of Saints Peter and Paul is recorded first. In 1186 the then competent Prince-Bishop of Verden, Tammo (d. 1188), further privileged the collegiate church.

The city was razed to the ground, with the exception of the churches, in 1189 by Henry the Lion. Until that time, it was the most prosperous commercial city in northern Germany.

Today's building of the former collegiate, meanwhile Lutheran church (with Dom being used in German language - pars pro toto - as a synecdoche for collegiate churches and cathedrals alike) was erected between 1389 and 1485.

References